Lithium soap is a soap consisting of a lithium salt of a fatty acid. Sodium-based and potassium-based soaps are used as cleaning agents in domestic and industrial applications, whereas lithium soaps are used as components of lithium grease (white lithium).

Lithium soaps are produced by saponification of triglycerides, using lithium hydroxide or lithium carbonate as the saponification agent. Lithium soaps are used as lubricant components and form-release agents at relatively high temperatures. 
The main components of lithium soaps are lithium stearate and lithium 12-hydroxystearate.

Lithium grease

Lubricating greases are commonly formulated as mixtures of an oil and a lithium soap thickener. Some formulations include PTFE or other substances, such as molybdenum disulfide.

Lithium grease adheres particularly well to metal, is non-corrosive, may be used under heavy loads, and exhibits good temperature tolerance. Lithium greases using a thickener formed by reacting a simple lithium soap with an acid are known as lithium complex greases and have higher dropping points as well as improvements to other properties.

See also

 Helium compounds#Predicted compounds

References

Greases

Organolithium compounds